was a Japanese zoologist.

Biography
Kakichi Mitsukuri was born in Edo.  In 1873 he came to the United States, where he received a Ph.D. degree from Yale in 1879 and from Johns Hopkins in 1883. He was appointed professor in the college of science of the Imperial University of Tokyo in 1882 and councilor of the university in 1893.  In 1896, he was made head of the fur-seal commission and signed, on behalf of Japan, a treaty with the United States and Great Britain. In 1897, invited by the Lowell Institute in Boston, he gave lectures on "Social life in Japan" , translated into French in 1922 as "La vie sociale au Japon". In 1901 he became dean of the college of science of Tokyo University, and in 1907 he was decorated with the Order of the Sacred Temple in recognition of public service.  In later life his time was largely occupied with administrative duties.  He was regarded not only as one of the leading zoologists of Japan, but also as very influential in public life.  His most important zoological publications, a series of papers on the embryology of the turtles, appeared at intervals from 1886 to 1896. Mitsukuri also brought the "holotype" goblin shark to the California Academy of Sciences where the genus was named after himself and the specimen trader Alan Owston, with the scientific name Mitsukurina ownstonii.

Works

See also
:Category:Taxa named by Kakichi Mitsukuri

References

1857 births
1909 deaths
Japanese naturalists
Japanese zoologists
Johns Hopkins University alumni
Mitsukuri family
People from Tokyo
Yale University alumni